Pecatonica High School is a public school in Blanchardville, Wisconsin serving students in grades 6 through 12. Its enrollment is about 230.

School's Environment
Pecatonica is rooted in the southwest of Wisconsin and his home to countless farmers and hard working people. It is a close knit community that flourishes on similar beliefs. The school is seen from an outside perspective as "hickish". There is even an FFA week which features at the end of each day a different activity that teaches the kids about agriculture. One of the most unique traditions is the bring your tractor to school day. Most days driving past the school's parking lot, you'll see a ton of beaten up used trucks, but on this special day, it's filled with tons of tractors. Pecatonica is truly unique and a totally different environment from the big schools in Madison, but is special in its small town traditions.

Environmental initiatives
In 2006, Pecatonica took part in the Wisconsin Governor’s High School Conference on the Environment to learn about the state's climate record, global climate change, and related global environmental issues. In 2011 the high school began a recycling program headed by a graduate of the class of 2011.

In 2001, Pecatonica participated in a United States Environmental Protection Agency program that provided specialized training, equipment, and training materials for teachers on ground water contamination and testing.

Recognition
In 2017, Pecatonica High School was a Silver Award Recipient for Best High Schools in Wisconsin. In 2018, the high school received a Bronze Award. In 2017, Pecatonica High School was recognized as a "College Board Advanced Placement Pacesetting" School for the number of students who took AP Exams and received scores of three or higher. In 2016 and 2005, Pecatonica received a Standing Up for Rural Schools, Communities, and Libraries award from the Wisconsin Superintendent of Schools. The award provides recognition of rural communities that advocate for schools, libraries, and lifestyle at a time when the communities are financially challenged.

Athletics
The Pecatonica's girls' basketball team won the Wisconsin Interscholastic Athletic Association Division 4 state championship in 1993 and 1994. In 2001, both the boys' and girls' basketball teams were runners-up at their respective state tournaments. The school mascot is the Viking. The Pecatonica/Argyle co-op football team was runner-up at the 2004 state tournament. In 2019, the men’s track and field qualified for State in the 4x800 meter relay. The team took fourth in the relay and broke the school record by over ten seconds. The baseball team also had a very successful season but faltered at the end of the 2019 season in the similar but disappointing manner in which they ended their previous few seasons.

References

External links
 Official site
 U.S. News & World Report Best High Schools

Public high schools in Wisconsin
Public middle schools in Wisconsin
Schools in Lafayette County, Wisconsin
Schools in Iowa County, Wisconsin